The Gollum galaxias (Galaxias gollumoides) is a galaxiid of the genus Galaxias, found only in New Zealand, on Stewart Island/Rakiura, throughout the Catlins and Southland, and in the Nevis River. It grows to a length of up to 15 cm.

References

 
 NIWA June 2006

Galaxias
Endemic freshwater fish of New Zealand
Taxa named by Bob McDowall
Fish described in 1999
Organisms named after Tolkien and his works